Nitin Mukesh Mathur is an Indian playback singer known for his work as a playback singer in Hindi films as well as Bhajans. He has toured internationally, including to the United States in 1993, and a world tour in 2006 with his show Kal Ki Yaadein as a tribute to his father Mukesh.

Nitin Mukesh worked with notable music directors like Khayyam, R. D. Burman, Laxmikant-Pyarelal, Bappi Lahiri, Rajesh Roshan, Nadeem-Shravan, Anand–Milind during the 1980s and 1990s. He voiced for actors like Manoj Kumar, Shashi Kapoor, Jeetendra, Anil Kapoor, Jackie Shroff and others.

Songs by film 
 "Woh Kehte Hain Hum Se" (Dariya Dil)
 "My Name Is Lakhan" (Ram Lakhan)
 "Dil Ne Dil Se Kaha" (Aaina)
 "Is Jahaan Ki Nahin" (King Uncle)
 "Chandi Ki Cycle" (Bhabhi)
 "Paisa Bolta Hai" (Kala Bazaar)
 "Krishna Krishna" (Kishen Kanhaiya)
 "Tu Mujhe Suna" (Chandni)
 "Jaisi Karni Waisi" (Jaisi Karni Waisi Bharni)
 "So Gaya Yeh Jahan" (Tezaab)
 "Kasam Kya Hoti Hai" (Kasam) 
 "Tune Mohe Taka" (Sone Pe Suhaaga) 
 "Chal Gori Pyar Ke Gaon Mein" (Mulzim) 
 "Woh Kehte Hain Hum" (Dariya Dil)
 "Zindagi Har Kadam" (Meri Jung)
 "Zindagi Ki Na Toote Ladi" (Kranti)
 "Aaja Re O Mere Dilbar" (Noorie)
 "Wafa Na Raas Aayee" (Bewafa Sanam)
 "Duma Dum Mast Kalandar" (Naakabandi)
 "Mere Khayal Se Tum" (Balmaa)
 "Zindagi Ka Naam Dosti" (Khudgarz) (1987)
 "Hey Re Dayamay Apni" (Ghar Ghar Ki Kahani) (1970)
 "Batao Tumhe Pyar Kaise" (Santosh (film)) (1989)
 "Teri Jheel Si Gehri Aankhon" (Dhuen Ki Lakeer)  (1974)

Work with other singers 
Nitin Mukesh started his career in the late 1970s and has sung hit duets with notable singers like Lata Mangeshkar, Asha Bhosle, Anuradha Paudwal, Kavita Krishnamurthy, Sadhana Sargam and Alka Yagnik. Some of the songs are:

Personal life 
Nitin Mukesh's father is Mukesh, who was a Mathur Kayastha from Delhi, while his mother, Saral Trivedi, is a Gujarati Shrimali Brahmin.

Nitin's son Neil Nitin Mukesh is an actor.

References

External links 
 

Living people
Indian male playback singers
Bollywood playback singers
Performers of Hindu music
Scindia School alumni
Place of birth missing (living people)
1951 births
Gujarati people
Indian Hindus